KBZE (105.9 FM) is the only urban radio station located between New Orleans and Baton Rouge, and Lafayette. It broadcasts the Steve Harvey Morning Show, and live local news and sports six times a day, weekdays.

Although KBZE's format is urban adult contemporary, the station also broadcasts local programming, including a 15-minute weekday broadcast at 9:30 a.m. by Bishop Hebert Andrew, pastor of the Beacon Light Baptist Church of Houma, weekday contemporary gospel with Pastor Lee Condolle from 9am to 11am, and a live two jock lunch hour with DJ Fab
and Mike Tyte (Joshua Singleton of Franklin and Michael Turner of New Orleans).

Licensed to Berwick, Louisiana, United States, the station is owned by Hubcast Broadcasting Inc.

The station serves a seven parish region, however, it focuses most of its interest on the Houma/Thibodaux/Morgan City/Franklin metropolitan areas.

Currently, the station is being simulcast over sister station KFRA 1390 kHz Franklin, Louisiana

The station also features a webcast of its stream at www.kbze.com. Android and I-Phone customers can listen to the station by using the Tune-In Application, a free download.

Also, these two radio stations are New Orleans Pelicans affiliates. They also broadcast area high school football, basketball softball and baseball.

Transmitter 
As of Early 2015 the station transmitter is currently hosted on the KMRC-AM tower in Stephenville La.

History
The station was started around 1990, becoming licensed as KVPO in 1991 as a 3,200 watt station at its present tower location. The station changed to its current KBZE calls on October 16, 1992, and was granted an increase of power to 4,000 watts in 1995.  The KBZE calls where once used by a radio station licensed to Security, Colorado from 1989 to 1991.

References

External links

Radio stations in Louisiana
Urban adult contemporary radio stations in the United States